{|

|}

The General Electric T31 (company designation TG-100A) was the first turboprop engine designed and built in the United States.

Design and development

The TG-100A benefited from the Anglo/American technology exchange with one of its designers, Glenn Warren, stating that one of the most important British contributions was the concept of multiple combustion cans. The GE axial compressor design was directly influenced by NACA with their 8-stage compressor. NACA had developed the theory and designed and tested the compressor. 

General Electric adopted a single shaft engine configuration, like the Rolls-Royce Dart
, where the turbine drove both the compressor and the propeller reduction gearbox. This epicyclic gearbox was relatively long. Air entered a screened annular intake directly behind the gearbox. After compression, the air entered the combustion chambers in a radially outward direction. These chambers were mounted around the casing of the axial compressor, presumably to shorten the shaft. A portion of the air destined for the combustion chambers was diverted to cool the turbine nozzle guide vanes before entering the outer part of the combustion chambers. Combustion products exiting the chambers discharged through the single stage turbine before entering a rapidly converging annular exhaust terminated by a circular tail pipe. Although the 14 stage all-axial compressor produced a decent pressure ratio (approximately 6.15:1 at design speed; 5.3:1 at Maximum Power, SLS,ISA), it was not particularly efficient. A large diameter turbine facilitated the use of a single stage, whereas the Rolls-Royce Dart (which had a similar engine cycle) required 3 stages. 

The General Electric XT31 was first used in the experimental Consolidated Vultee XP-81.  The XP-81 first flew in December 1945, the first aircraft to use a combination of turboprop and turbojet power.

The T31 engine was the first American turboprop engine to power an aircraft. It made its initial flight in the Consolidated Vultee XP-81 on 21 December 1945. The T31 was mounted in the nose; an Allison J33 turbojet engine mounted in the rear fuselage provided added thrust. The T31 was also used on the Navy XF2R-1, similarly powered by a turboprop/turbojet engine combination. The engine was to have been flown experimentally on a Curtiss XC-113 (a converted Curtiss C-46), but the experiment was abandoned after the XC-113 was involved in a ground accident. Only 28 T31s were built; none were used in production aircraft, but improved production turboprop engines were developed from the technology pioneered by the T31.

A derivative of the T31, the General Electric TG-110A, given the military designation T41, was ordered but subsequently cancelled.

Applications
 Consolidated Vultee XP-81
 Curtiss-Wright XC-113
 Ryan XF2R Dark Shark

Specification (TG-100A)

Specification (T31-GE-3)

See also

References

1940s turboprop engines
T31
Abandoned military aircraft engine projects of the United States
Axial-compressor gas turbine engines